Alondra is a feminine given name. It is the Spanish word for "lark". It was the most popular name for girls born in Puerto Rico in 2009.

People 
 Alondra de la Parra (born 1980), Mexican conductor
 Alondra Hidalgo (born 1989), Mexican voice actress
 Alondra Johnson (born 1965), Canadian Football League linebacker
 Alondra Nelson, American academic and writer
 Alondra Oubré, American female medical anthropologist

References

Feminine given names